Camilo Andrés Ceballos Zapata  (born 15 July 1984) is a Colombian football defender.

External links
 

1984 births
Living people
Colombian footballers
Envigado F.C. players
Atlético Junior footballers
Deportivo Cali footballers
Once Caldas footballers
Águilas Doradas Rionegro players
Deportivo Pasto footballers
Real Cartagena footballers
Categoría Primera A players
Categoría Primera B players
Association football defenders
People from Apartadó
Sportspeople from Antioquia Department
21st-century Colombian people